Mehmet Göktuğ Bakırbaş (born 1 June 1996) is a Turkish professional footballer who plays as a goalkeeper for Erzurumspor.

Professional career
Bakırbaş is a youth product of Göztepe, and signed his first professional contract with them. Bakırbaş spent the 2017-18 season on loan with Manisaspor in the TFF First League, and on 3 March 2018 scored a game-tying goal in the 90th minute against Denizlispor. Bakırbaş made his professional debut with Göztepe in a 1-0 Süper Lig loss to Galatasaray on 19 August 2018.

References

External links
 
 
 

1996 births
People from Konak
Living people
Turkish footballers
Turkey youth international footballers
Association football goalkeepers
Göztepe S.K. footballers
Manisaspor footballers
Ümraniyespor footballers
Büyükşehir Belediye Erzurumspor footballers
Süper Lig players
TFF First League players